List of notable grain elevators:

Canada

Alberta
 Acadia Valley - Prairie Elevator Museum, former Alberta Wheat Pool converted into a tea house / museum.
 Alberta Central Railroad Museum - former Alberta Wheat Pool, second oldest standing grain elevator in Alberta, moved from Hobbema.
 Andrew - former Alberta Wheat Pool, restored into a museum.
 Castor - former Alberta Pacific, restored into a museum.
 Big Valley - Alberta Wheat Pool used as a museum complete with a train station and Roundhouse.
 Edmonton - Ritchie Mill, former flour mill converted into restaurants, law offices and condos.
 Esther - former Alberta Wheat Pool, restored into a museum.
 Haselwood Mill - Alberta's oldest seed cleaning mill, operated from the 1930s to 1960s.
 Heritage Acres Farm Museum - restored United Grain Growers elevator moved from Brocket.
 Heritage Park Historical Village, former Security Elevator Co. LTD. moved from Shonts
 Kinuso - United Grain Growers with Original UGG Logo.
 Leduc - former Alberta wheat Pool saved from demolition now a museum.
 Lougheed -
 Mayerthorpe - 1966 Federal Grain Co. now an interpretive center.
 Meeting Creek, a refurbished Alberta Wheat Pool, Pacific Grain elevator and CN train station.
 Nanton - Canadian Grain Elevator Discovery Centre, three elevators saved from demolition and preserved to educate visitors about the town's, and Alberta's, agricultural history.
 Paradise Valley - operated as the Climb Thru Time Museum.
 Radway - Krause Milling Co. restored into a museum.
 Raley - oldest standing grain elevator on its original site in Alberta, built in 1909 maintaining many of its original features.
 Rowley - a United Grain Growers, and Alberta Wheat Pool elevators saved from demolition by locals and now fully restored.
 Scandia - 1920s Alberta Wheat Pool now a museum.
 South Peace Centennial Museum, United Grain Growers moved from Albright.
 Spruce Grove - Spruce Grove Grain Elevator Museum, 1958 Alberta Wheat Pool, saved from demolition and maintained as an operating museum.
 St. Albert - 1906 Alberta Grain Co. and 1929 Alberta Wheat Pool Elevators now restored.
Stirling Elevator, near Stirling, Alberta, Canada, built 1998-1999.
 Stettler - 1920 Parrish and Heimbecker grain elevator / feed mill and coal shed, last to stand in Alberta now protected and restored as a museum.
 Ukrainian Cultural Heritage Village - Former Home Grain Co. moved from Bellis
 Warner - Warner elevator row, last surviving elevator row in Alberta with a total of 3 elevators. Currently unprotected.

British Columbia

 Creston - former Alberta Wheat Pool (1936) and United Grain Growers (1937) elevators that still stand tall on the edge of the downtown core in the middle of the Creston Valley.
 Dawson Creek - restored and refurbished as a community art gallery.

Manitoba

 Inglis - Inglis elevator row, last surviving elevator row in Manitoba with a total of four elevators. Now designated and protected as a National Historic Site of Canada.
 Niverville - Western Canada's first grain elevator, erected by William Hespeler in 1879 
 Plum Coulee - grain elevator refurbished as a restaurant and meeting rooms.
 Holmfield - Harrison Grain elevator and flour mill - still owned by the Harrison family

Ontario
 Port Perry - formerly Curries Grain Elevator(1873)and A.Ross and son, Port Perry.  Canada's oldest grain elevator or granary still stands as a sentinel   on the edge of the Queen Street, Port Perry, Scugog the prestige shopping district on the shores of Lake Scugog. A must see for all old mill and grain elevator enthusiasts. This grain elevator is far older than those in Elva, Manitoba and Fleming, Saskatchewan by almost twenty years and the second oldest grain elevator in the Americas.

 Schomberg

Saskatchewan

 Coderre - derelict
 Edam - former Saskatchewan Wheat Pool now a museum.
 Fleming - oldest standing grain elevator on its original site in Fleming, built in 1895 and maintaining many of its original features.
 Gravelbourg - Former Saskatchewan Wheat Pool saved from demolition and now a museum.
 Indian Head - experimental farm grain elevator refurbished as a Café, coffee house.
 North Battleford Heritage Museum - former Saskatchewan Wheat Pool moved from North Battleford.
 Sukanen Ship Pioneer Village and Museum - former Victoria - McCabe moved from Mawer.
 Val Marie - former Federal and 1967 Centennial Saskatchewan Wheat Pool now museums.
 Western Development Museum, former Saskatchewan Wheat Pool moved from ??.
 Wood Mountain - former Saskatchewan Wheat Pool now a museum.

Quebec
 Grain Elevator no. 3 - Port of Montreal - former Miron Elevating - Montreal 
 Grain Elevator no. 4 - Viterra Terminal | Cereal Terminal - Port of Montreal - Montreal
 Grain Elevator no. 5 - Port of Montreal - former Grand Trunk Elevator - Montreal
 Canada Linseed Oil - Abandoned plant elevator. 
 Canada Multi-Food Ltd. - Montreal
 Canada Malting Co. Ltd. - Port of Montreal - New elevator - Montreal 
 Canada Malting Co. Ltd. - St. Henri - Old elevator - Montreal

Switzerland

United States

Baltimore, Maryland
 Baltimore and Ohio Locust Point Grain Terminal Elevator, one of the largest grain terminal elevators to be constructed in the early 20th century, with a capacity of 3.8 billion bushels in Baltimore, Maryland.
 Silo Point, currently being reconstructed from a grain elevator to a condominium located in Baltimore, Maryland.

Buffalo, New York

 Cargill Pool Elevator, previously named the Saskatchewan Cooperative Elevator was built in 1925 offered a total holding capacity of 2.1 million bushels in 135 bins. 
 Cargill Superior elevator, marked as Cargill "S", built between 1914 and 1925.
 Concrete-Central Elevator, Buffalo, New York The largest transfer elevator in the world at the time of its completion in 1917.
 Connecting Terminal, Clearly visible from across canalside and the Commercial Slip the structure is now used for boat storage.
 General Mills Plant, or "The Frontier Elevator" General Mill's Buffalo factory is a large scale grain mill and cereal production facility, most notably producing Gold Medal brand flour, Wheaties, Cheerios and other General Mills brand cereals.
 Dart's Elevator, the world's first steam powered elevator - built in 1842.
 Great Northern Elevator, built in 1897 by the Great Northern Railroad.
 Lake & Rail Grain Elevator, part of the "elevator alley" The Lake and Rail produces over 2,700,00 pounds of flour a day.
 Marine A grain elevator, also part of the "elevator alley" and across from the Lake & Rail Grain Elevator.
 The Standard Elevator, was named after the Standard Milling Company and built in 1926.
 Wollenberg Grain and Seed Elevator, wooden "country style" elevator formerly located in Buffalo, New York; destroyed by fire in October 2006.

Illinois
 Archer Daniels Midland Wheat Mill, constructed in 1927, in Chicago's Fulton Market District.
 Armour's Warehouse, constructed in 1861–62 on the north bank of the Illinois-Michigan Canal in Seneca, Illinois.

Minnesota
 Northwestern Consolidated Milling Company Elevator A, also known as the Ceresota Building and "The Million Bushel Elevator" was a receiving and public grain elevator built by the Northwestern Consolidated Milling Company in 1908 in Minneapolis, Minnesota.
Peavey–Haglin Experimental Concrete Grain Elevator, St. Louis Park, Minnesota, USA, built in 1899–1900.
Saint Paul Municipal Grain Terminal, in St. Paul, Minnesota, on the NRHP.

North Dakota
 North Dakota Mill and Elevator, largest flour mill in the United States, located in Grand Forks, North Dakota.

Oklahoma
 Bricktown, Oklahoma City, Oklahoma is home to OKC Rocks, a former grain elevator that has been turned into an indoor rock climbing facility located in Oklahoma City, Oklahoma.
 Ingersoll Tile Elevator, elevator constructed of hollow red clay tiles, located in Ingersoll, Oklahoma.

Pennsylvania
Reading Company Grain Elevator, export elevator in Philadelphia converted into offices.

The John Thompson Coal Sheds and Granary, the only wooden grain elevator in Pennsylvania. Located in Lemont, Pennsylvania.

South Dakota
 
 Zip Feed Tower, tallest occupiable structure in South Dakota from its construction in 1956-1957 until its demolition in December 2005.

 Wyoming
 Sheridan Flouring Mills, Inc., an industrial complex in Sheridan, Wyoming.

Other countries

See also

 Grain elevator
 Storage silo
 Granary

References

Grain elevators